Catherine Shan (born 1952) is a writer from France.

The daughter of a French mother and a Senegalese father, she was born Catherine N'Diaye and grew up in Africa. From 1975 to 1981, she was a philosophy professor in France. From 1982 to 1983, she worked in the office of the director general of UNESCO. Shan then was employed as a journalist, working with the group "Jeune Afrique", for the magazine Géo, for Radio Nederlands and as a freelancer. She also wrote or directed a number of films.

Selected publications 
 Gens de sable, autobiographical novel (1984)
 La coquetterie ou la passion du détail, essay (1987)
 La vie à deux, novel (1998)
 Sa vie africaine, novel (2007)

Selected films 
 Un dimanche à Paris (1994), wrote script
 Emmanuel Bove (1996), co-wrote script
 Le cycle des saisons (1998), director
 L'atelier de Susan, documentary (2005), director
 L'œil de la forêt (2005), director

References 

1952 births
Living people
Senegalese women novelists
Senegalese novelists
Senegalese women film directors
Senegalese film directors
Senegalese journalists
Senegalese women journalists
Senegalese emigrants to France